The 1968–69 Seattle SuperSonics season was the second season of the Seattle franchise in the NBA. The Sonics finished the regular season with a 30–52 record in 6th place on the Western Division. During the offseason, Seattle traded their top scorer Walt Hazzard to the Atlanta Hawks to bring three-time All-Star Lenny Wilkens, who would serve as head coach of the team the following year.

Draft picks

Note: only draft picks who participated in at least one game in the NBA are listed.

Roster

Regular season

Season standings

x – clinched playoff spot

Record vs. opponents

Game log

|- bgcolor=#fcc
| 1
| October 17
| @ San Diego
| L 110–128
| Bob Rule (31)
|
|
| San Diego Sports Arena5,332
| 0–1

|- bgcolor=#fcc
| 2
| October 18
| @ Phoenix
| L 107–116
| Bob Rule (34)
|
|
| Arizona Veterans Memorial Coliseum7,112
| 0–2

|- bgcolor=#fcc
| 3
| October 19
| San Francisco Warriors
| L 95–107
| Bob Rule (25)
|
|
| Seattle Center Coliseum4,311
| 0–3

|- bgcolor=#fcc
| 4
| October 21
| Baltimore
| L 104–111
| Tom Meschery (30)
|
|
| Vancouver, BC2,387
| 0–4

|- bgcolor=#cfc
| 5
| October 23
| San Diego
| W 118–117
| Bob Rule, Lenny Wilkens (20)
|
|
| Seattle Center Coliseum3,064
| 1–4

|- bgcolor=#cfc
| 6
| October 25
| Atlanta
| W 123–112
| Tom Meschery (24)
|
|
| Seattle Center Coliseum4,689
| 2–4

|- bgcolor=#fcc
| 7
| October 27
| Baltimore
| L 114–126
| Tom Meschery (22)
|
|
| Seattle Center Coliseum4,882
| 2–5

|- bgcolor=#fcc
| 8
| October 30
| Phoenix
| L 108–115
| Bob Rule (22)
|
|
| Seattle Center Coliseum2,657
| 2–6

|- bgcolor=#cfc
| 9
| November 2
| Chicago
| W 101–95
| Bob Rule (24)
|
|
| Seattle Center Coliseum4,330
| 3–6

|- bgcolor=#fcc
| 10
| November 3
| New York
| L 108–122
| Lenny Wilkens (24)
|
|
| Seattle Center Coliseum4,807
| 3–7

|- bgcolor=#fcc
| 11
| November 6
| @ Detroit
| L 118–127
| Rod Thorn (21)
|
|
| Cobo Arena3,462
| 3–8

|- bgcolor=#fcc
| 12
| November 7
| @ Chicago
| L 105–120
| Bob Rule (23)
|
|
| Chicago Stadium891
| 3–9

|- bgcolor=#cfc
| 13
| November 8
| @ Boston
| W 114–112
| Bob Rule (37)
|
|
| Boston Garden7,606
| 4–9

|- bgcolor=#fcc
| 14
| November 9
| @ Philadelphia
| L 94–114
| Lenny Wilkens (26)
|
|
| The Spectrum6,756
| 4–10

|- bgcolor=#fcc
| 15
| November 11
| Philadelphia
| L 117–127
| Bob Rule (29)
|
|
| Boston, MA
| 4–11

|- bgcolor=#fcc
| 16
| November 12
| @ Milwaukee
| L 114–127
| Bob Rule (28)
|
|
| Milwaukee Arena4,455
| 4–12

|- bgcolor=#fcc
| 17
| November 13
| Atlanta
| L 113–142
| Lenny Wilkens (27)
|
|
| Seattle Center Coliseum3,102
| 4–13

|- bgcolor=#cfc
| 18
| November 15
| Phoenix
| W 128–124 (2OT)
| Lenny Wilkens (30)
|
|
| Seattle Center Coliseum4,368
| 5–13

|- bgcolor=#cfc
| 19
| November 16
| Detroit
| W 123–119
| Bob Rule (42)
|
|
| Seattle Center Coliseum5,446
| 6–13

|- bgcolor=#fcc
| 20
| November 17
| @ Los Angeles
| L 94–105
| Lenny Wilkens (16)
|
|
| The Forum8,399
| 6–14

|- bgcolor=#fcc
| 21
| November 20
| Boston
| L 92–139
| Art Harris (16)
|
|
| Seattle Center Coliseum7,021
| 6–15

|- bgcolor=#fcc
| 22
| November 22
| @ San Diego
| L 111–126
| Bob Rule (24)
|
|
| San Diego Sports Arena5,247
| 6–16

|- bgcolor=#fcc
| 23
| November 23
| @ San Francisco Warriors
| L 119–132
| Lenny Wilkens (25)
|
|
| Oakland–Alameda County Coliseum Arena5,922
| 6–17

|- bgcolor=#cfc
| 24
| November 24
| Milwaukee
| W 141–120
| Tom Meschery, Lenny Wilkens (21)
|
|
| Seattle Center Coliseum3,485
| 7–17

|- bgcolor=#cfc
| 25
| November 25
| Milwaukee
| W 123–113
| Lenny Wilkens (29)
|
|
| Vancouver, BC2,879
| 8–17

|- bgcolor=#cfc
| 26
| November 26
| Chicago
| W 99–98
| Bob Rule (28)
|
|
| Seattle Center Coliseum2,895
| 9–17

|- bgcolor=#cfc
| 27
| November 28
| Milwaukee
| W 115–103
| Bob Rule (27)
|
|
| Seattle Center Coliseum5,210
| 10–17

|- bgcolor=#cfc
| 28
| December 2
| @ Phoenix
| W 118–108
| Lenny Wilkens (33)
|
|
| Arizona Veterans Memorial Coliseum2,171
| 11–17

|- bgcolor=#fcc
| 29
| December 3
| @ San Francisco Warriors
| L 122 127
| Lenny Wilkens (31)
|
|
| Oakland–Alameda County Coliseum Arena2,116
| 11–18

|- bgcolor=#cfc
| 30
| December 6
| San Francisco Warriors
| W 109–100 (OT)
| Tom Meschery (29)
|
|
| Seattle Center Coliseum5,941
| 12–18

|- bgcolor=#cfc
| 31
| December 7
| @ San Francisco Warriors
| W 115–107
| Bob Rule (31)
|
|
| Oakland–Alameda County Coliseum Arena3,754
| 13–18

|- bgcolor=#fcc
| 32
| December 12
| Atlanta
| L 91–93
| Lenny Wilkens (25)
|
|
| Seattle Center Coliseum4,361
| 13–19

|- bgcolor=#fcc
| 33
| December 14
| Los Angeles
| L 120–136
| Tom Meschery, Bob Rule (27)
|
|
| Seattle Center Coliseum12,186
| 13–20

|- bgcolor=#fcc
| 34
| December 15
| @ Los Angeles
| L 114–115
| Bob Rule (37)
|
|
| The Forum6,878
| 13–21

|- bgcolor=#fcc
| 35
| December 18
| Philadelphia
| L 111–115
| Bob Rule (36)
|
|
| Seattle Center Coliseum3,389
| 13–22

|- bgcolor=#fcc
| 36
| December 20
| @ Milwaukee
| L 92–100
| Lenny Wilkens (21)
|
|
| Milwaukee Arena5,303
| 13–23

|- bgcolor=#fcc
| 37
| December 21
| @ New York
| L 105–131
| Bob Rule (19)
|
|
| Madison Square Garden13,998
| 13–24

|- bgcolor=#fcc
| 38
| December 25
| @ Baltimore
| L 112–118
| Bob Rule, Lenny Wilkens (27)
|
|
| Baltimore Civic Center5,261
| 13–25

|- bgcolor=#fcc
| 39
| December 26
| @ Atlanta
| L 96–126
| Al Tucker (18)
|
|
| Alexander Memorial Coliseum3,697
| 13–26

|- bgcolor=#fcc
| 40
| December 28
| New York
| L 108–111
| Lenny Wilkens (19)
|
|
| Seattle Center Coliseum7,602
| 13–27

|- bgcolor=#fcc
| 41
| December 29
| New York
| L 112–120
| Art Harris (21)
|
|
| Vancouver, BC2,894
| 13–28

|- bgcolor=#cfc
| 42
| December 30
| Phoenix
| W 120–118
| Art Harris, Rule (24)
|
|
| Seattle Center Coliseum3,920
| 14–28

|- bgcolor=#fcc
| 43
| January 4
| @ San Diego
| L 105–122
| Lenny Wilkens (28)
|
|
| San Diego Sports Arena4,878
| 14–29

|- bgcolor=#fcc
| 44
| January 6
| Boston
| L 97–121
| Bob Rule (36)
|
|
| Seattle Center Coliseum6,636
| 14–30

|- bgcolor=#fcc
| 45
| January 7
| @ Phoenix
| L 112–116
| Three players (23)
|
|
| Arizona Veterans Memorial Coliseum2,875
| 14–31

|- bgcolor=#cfc
| 46
| January 9
| Cincinnati
| W 119–110
| Bob Rule (32)
|
|
| Cleveland, OH2,017
| 15–31

|- bgcolor=#fcc
| 47
| January 10
| @ Milwaukee
| L 104–115
| Bob Rule, Al Tucker (17)
|
|
| Milwaukee Arena4,150
| 15–32

|- bgcolor=#fcc
| 48
| January 11
| @ Chicago
| L 86–119
| Lenny Wilkens (21)
|
|
| Chicago Stadium3,870
| 15–33

|- bgcolor=#fcc
| 49
| January 17
| New York
| L 94–114
| Bob Rule (16)
|
|
| Philadelphia, PA
| 15–34

|- bgcolor=#fcc
| 50
| January 18
| @ Boston
| L 97–111
| Bob Rule (29)
|
|
| Boston Garden9,320
| 15–35

|- bgcolor=#fcc
| 51
| January 21
| @ New York
| L 106–113
| Lenny Wilkens (31)
|
|
| Madison Square Garden11,227
| 15–36

|- bgcolor=#cfc
| 52
| January 22
| @ Baltimore
| W 98–94
| Lenny Wilkens (22)
|
|
| Baltimore Civic Center3,619
| 16–36

|- bgcolor=#cfc
| 53
| January 27
| Milwaukee
| W 128–107
| Bob Rule (31)
|
|
| Tacoma, WA4,150
| 17–36

|- bgcolor=#cfc
| 54
| January 29
| Boston
| W 124–122 (OT)
| Bob Rule (26)
|
|
| Philadelphia, PA
| 18–36

|- bgcolor=#fcc
| 55
| January 30
| Detroit
| L 118–144
| Bob Rule (26)
|
|
| Baltimore, MD
| 18–37

|- bgcolor=#cfc
| 56
| January 31
| @ Atlanta
| W 119–112
| Bob Rule (32)
|
|
| Alexander Memorial Coliseum3,550
| 19–37

|- bgcolor=#fcc
| 57
| February 1
| @ Cincinnati
| L 96–111
| Bob Rule (20)
|
|
| Cincinnati Gardens6,114
| 19–38

|- bgcolor=#cfc
| 58
| February 3
| Los Angeles
| W 114–107
| Bob Rule (38)
|
|
| Seattle Center Coliseum7,721
| 20–38

|- bgcolor=#cfc
| 59
| February 4
| @ San Francisco Warriors
| W 116–111
| Lenny Wilkens (28)
|
|
| Oakland–Alameda County Coliseum Arena2,145
| 21–38

|- bgcolor=#fcc
| 60
| February 5
| Philadelphia
| L 115–119
| Art Harris, Rule (27)
|
|
| Seattle Center Coliseum4,956
| 21–39

|- bgcolor=#cfc
| 61
| February 7
| Cincinnati
| W 102–97
| Lenny Wilkens (32)
|
|
| Seattle Center Coliseum7,350
| 22–39

|- bgcolor=#fcc
| 62
| February 9
| San Francisco Warriors
| L 120–121
| Bob Rule (31)
|
|
| Seattle Center Coliseum7,545
| 22–40

|- bgcolor=#fcc
| 63
| February 12
| Los Angeles
| L 92–109
| Bob Rule (24)
|
|
| Seattle Center Coliseum11,218
| 22–41

|- bgcolor=#cfc
| 64
| February 16
| Detroit
| W 127–119
| Bob Rule (36)
|
|
| Seattle Center Coliseum6,367
| 23–41

|- bgcolor=#cfc
| 65
| February 18
| Chicago
| W 114–113
| Bob Rule (27)
|
|
| Seattle Center Coliseum5,002
| 24–41

|- bgcolor=#fcc
| 66
| February 19
| Detroit
| L 124–131
| Bob Rule (32)
|
|
| Seattle Center Coliseum3,356
| 24–42

|- bgcolor=#fcc
| 67
| February 21
| Philadelphia
| L 109–115
| Bob Rule (31)
|
|
| Seattle Center Coliseum8,638
| 24–43

|- bgcolor=#cfc
| 68
| February 23
| Boston
| W 118–116
| Lenny Wilkens (35)
|
|
| Seattle Center Coliseum8,742
| 25–43

|- bgcolor=#fcc
| 69
| February 25
| @ Los Angeles
| L 111–114 (OT)
| Lenny Wilkens (26)
|
|
| The Forum10,311
| 25–44

|- bgcolor=#fcc
| 70
| February 26
| Chicago
| L 122–124
| Bob Rule (30)
|
|
| Seattle Center Coliseum4,138
| 25–45

|- bgcolor=#cfc
| 71
| March 1
| Cincinnati
| W 134–122
| Bob Rule (47)
|
|
| Seattle Center Coliseum9,477
| 26–45

|- bgcolor=#fcc
| 72
| March 3
| Cincinnati
| L 107–113
| Bob Rule (32)
|
|
| Seattle Center Coliseum4,028
| 26–46

|- bgcolor=#cfc
| 73
| March 4
| San Diego
| W 130–116
| Lenny Wilkens (33)
|
|
| Seattle Center Coliseum5,010
| 27–46

|- bgcolor=#cfc
| 74
| March 8
| Baltimore
| W 138–117
| Lenny Wilkens (32)
|
|
| Seattle Center Coliseum12,382
| 28–46

|- bgcolor=#cfc
| 75
| March 12
| San Diego
| W 125–112
| Lenny Wilkens (36)
|
|
| Vancouver, BC5,998
| 29–46

|- bgcolor=#cfc
| 76
| March 13
| Milwaukee
| W 141–118
| Tom Meschery (21)
|
|
| Green Bay, WI3,461
| 30–46

|- bgcolor=#fcc
| 77
| March 15
| @ Chicago
| L 83–101
| Lenny Wilkens (26)
|
|
| Chicago Stadium5,254
| 30–47

|- bgcolor=#fcc
| 78
| March 16
| @ Atlanta
| L 127–131 (OT)
| Art Harris (31)
|
|
| Alexander Memorial Coliseum7,190
| 30–48

|- bgcolor=#fcc
| 79
| March 18
| @ Baltimore
| L 120–130
| Lenny Wilkens (26)
|
|
| Baltimore Civic Center8,020
| 30–49

|- bgcolor=#fcc
| 80
| March 19
| @ Philadelphia
| L 115–136
| Bob Rule, Rod Thorn (16)
|
|
| The Spectrum11,474
| 30–50

|- bgcolor=#fcc
| 81
| March 21
| @ Detroit
| L 104–110
| Erwin Mueller (15)
|
|
| Cobo Arena4,669
| 30–51

|- bgcolor=#fcc
| 82
| March 22
| @ Cincinnati
| L 127–134
| Lenny Wilkens (25)
|
|
| Cincinnati Gardens2,534
| 30–52

Player statistics

  Statistics with the Seattle SuperSonics.

Awards and records
 Art Harris was selected to the  NBA All-Rookie First Team.
 Lenny Wilkens made his sixth All-Star appearance for the West in the 1969 NBA All-Star Game held in Baltimore, Maryland.

Transactions

Overview

Trades

References

Seattle
Seattle SuperSonics seasons